R Aurigae (R Aur) is a Mira variable, a pulsating red giant star in the constellation of Auriga, at a distance of .

R Aurigae has an apparent visual magnitude which varies between 6.7 and 13.9 with a period of 450 days.  The light curve varies strongly from cycle to cycle, sometimes having a pronounced hump on the ascending branch and usually having rise and fall times approximately equal.  The cycle period has oscillated slowly between about 450 and 465 days.  The discoverer of R Aurigae's variability is not known, but it was widely observed in the late 19th century and its spectrum was described in 1890.

R Aurigae is catalogued as a component of a double star, with the 10th magnitude HD 233095, although the two stars are unrelated.

References

Auriga (constellation)
Mira variables
M-type giants
Double stars
034019
024645
Aurigae, R
1707
Durchmusterung objects
Emission-line stars